My Mind's Eye may refer to:
"My Mind's Eye" (Small Faces song), 1966
My Mind's Eye (album), 1992 album by The Comsat Angels
"My Mind's Eye", 2006 single by Sirenia from Nine Destinies and a Downfall